Gerda III is a lighthouse tender located at Mystic Seaport in Mystic, Connecticut, United States. Gerda III was built in 1928 in Denmark and was used as a common work boat. In 1943 Gerda III was used by 19-year old Henny Sinding to smuggle Jews from Nazi occupied Denmark to Sweden. Approximately 300 Jews were rescued by Gerda III. The Danish Parliament donated Gerda III to The Museum of Jewish Heritage in New York City. Mystic Seaport now cares for the vessel and features her as part of their collection of watercraft. The rescue story is the subject of the 1991 film A Day in October.

References

Tourist attractions in New London County, Connecticut
Ships built in Denmark
Museum ships in Mystic, Connecticut
1928 ships
Lighthouse tenders of Denmark
Danish resistance movement
Rescue of Jews during the Holocaust